The Yokohama Overseas Chinese School (YOCS) is a Republic of China-oriented Chinese international school in Naka-ku, Yokohama, Japan. It serves elementary through senior high school. As of 2010 Shih Huei-chen (施惠珍 Shī Huìzhēn) is the president of the school.

History
It was formed after the 1952 split of the Yokohama Chinese School, which was established by Sun Yat-sen. Yokohama Overseas was aligned with Taiwan, while the Yokohama Yamate Chinese School was aligned with the People's Republic of China.

In 2010 the school asked for assistance from Lien Fang Yu (連方瑀 Lián Fāngyǔ), the wife of Lien Chan; at that time the school had a shortage in funding. Yang Ching-huei described the buildings as "very old" and requiring "some serious renovation work." By 2011 the school established interviews and other entrance examinations due to an increase in prospective students.

Operations
As of 2010 most of the school's funding originates from tuition while the Overseas-Compatriots Commission provides some assistance. As of 2010 the school charges monthly tuition rates below the Japanese private school average of ¥50,000 per student; the monthly tuition per elementary or junior high student was ¥22,000 ($268 U.S. dollars) while the per-student tuition at the high school level was ¥25,000.

Curriculum
Each week first-year students have ten Chinese lessons, each lasting 45 minutes; four Japanese lessons, and one English lesson.

Student body
In 1997 each class had about one or two students who were Japanese. As of 2008 about 15% of its students were Japanese nationals, including ethnic Chinese persons with Japanese citizenship. As of 2010 71% of the students were children of Taiwanese families living in Japan and/or are originating from Taiwan. Other students were ethnic Chinese from other countries and Japanese. A YOCS teacher named Chiang Pin-huei (江品輝 Jiāng Pǐnhuī) stated in the Taipei Times that the "focused" education of the YOCS resulted in the high percentage of Taiwan-origin students. By 2011, due to the increase in popularity of international schools among Japanese parents, each first-year elementary class had about 20 Japanese students, making up about 33% of each class. As of that year some new students initially enrolling in the school did not have any understanding of Chinese.

See also
 Chinese people in Japan
 List of junior high schools in Kanagawa Prefecture
 List of elementary schools in Kanagawa Prefecture

Japanese international schools in Taiwan, Republic of China:
 Taipei Japanese School
 Kaohsiung Japanese School
 Taichung Japanese School

References

Further reading

Available online:
 Arisawa, Shino (有澤 知乃; Tokyo Gakugei University International Student Exchange Center (留学生センター)). "(A Research Note)Music Education at Overseas Chinese Schools in Japan : The Cases of Yokohama Yamate Chinese School and Yokohama Overseas Chinese School" ((研究ノート)中華学校における音楽教育 : 横浜山手中華学校と横浜中華学院を事例として; Archive" ((研究ノート)中華学校における音楽教育 : 横浜山手中華学校と横浜中華学院を事例として; Archive). Bulletin of Tokyo Gakugei University Humanities and Social Sciences II (東京学芸大学紀要. 人文社会科学系. II). 66, 205-215, 2015-01-30. Tokyo Gakugei University. See profile at CiNii. See profile at ETopia, Tokyo Gakugei University Repository (東京学芸大学リポジトリ). English abstract available.
 Odamaki, Shigeru (小田巻 滋; 横濱中華學院・非). "Geographical Education in Kakyo School, Japan-Case Study of Yokohama Chuka Gakuin.:Case Study of Yokohama Chuka Gakuin" (日本の華僑学校における地理教育　横浜中華学院を事例として:横濱中華學院を事例として; Archive" (日本の華僑学校における地理教育　横浜中華学院を事例として:横濱中華學院を事例として; Archive). The New Geography (新地理) 46(1), 41-55, June 1998. The Geographic Education Society of Japan. See profile and profile #2 at CiNii. See profile at J-Stage. DOI 10.5996/newgeo.46.41.

Not available online:
 Sugimura, Miki (杉村 美紀; Tokyo Gakugei University大学院博士課程). "Some Problems of Chinese Education in Japan : The Case of Yokohama Chinese Community" (在日華文学校の教育問題 : 「横浜中華学院」の事例を中心に). Research bulletin of international education (国際教育研究) 11, 52-54, 1991-03. Tokyo Gakugei University. See profile at CiNii.

 "倡辦中華學院 橫濱立碑紀念" (Archive" (Archive). Sing Tao Daily. April 26, 2011.

External links
 Yokohama Overseas Chinese School /

International schools in Yokohama
Taiwanese international schools in Japan
1952 establishments in Japan
Educational institutions established in 1952
Elementary schools in Japan
High schools in Yokohama
Naka-ku, Yokohama